Michael or Mike Hooper may refer to:

 Michael Hooper (bishop) (born 1941), former Suffragan Bishop of Ludlow
 Michael Hooper (rugby union) (born 1991), Australian rugby union player
 Mike Hooper (footballer) (born 1964),  English football goalkeeper
 Mike Hooper (baseball) (1850–1917), American baseball player
 Mike Hooper (cricketer) (1947–2010), English cricketer

See also
Michael Cooper (disambiguation)
Mike Cooper (disambiguation)